Carl Kenneth "Benny" Benhase (September 5, 1929 – February 8, 2018) was an American football player and coach. He served as the head football coach at Hanover College in Hanover, Indiana in 1963, compiling a record of 0–9. Benhase played college football at Miami University under head coach Woody Hayes. As a high school football coach in Ohio, he was an early pioneer of the no-huddle offense.

Benhase was born on September 5, 1929, Cincinnati, Ohio, to Henry Francis Benhase and Cora Willish Benhase. He grew up in Deer Park, Ohio, where he graduated from Deer Park High School in 1947. Benhase began his coaching and teaching career in Panama City, Florida before serving in the United States Army during the Korean War. During his military service, he was the backfield coach in 1952 for the All-Army champion football team at Fort Eustis in Newport News, Virginia. Benhase spent the fall of 1955 as the first assistant football coach in charge of the backfield and centers at Marion High School in Marion, Virginia. He earned a master's degree in education from the University of Virginia in 1957. Benhase was the head football coach at Berne Union High School in Sugar Grove, Ohio from 1956 to 1958, compiling a record of 21–3–3 in three seasons. In 1959, he moved on to Circleville High School in Circleville, Ohio, leading the football team to a record of 27–10–2 in five seasons.

Benhase died on February 8, 2018.

Head coaching record

College

References

1929 births
2018 deaths
American football quarterbacks
Hanover Panthers football coaches
Miami RedHawks football players
High school football coaches in Ohio
High school football coaches in Virginia
United States Army personnel of the Korean War 
Curry School of Education alumni
People from Deer Park, Ohio
Coaches of American football from Ohio
Players of American football from Cincinnati